Sir William Willys, 6th Baronet (c. 1685–1732) was a British politician who sat in the House of Commons from 1727 to 1732.

Willys was the second son of William Willys of Austin Friars, and his wife Catherine Gore, daughter of Robert Gore merchant of Chelsea and widow of George Evelyn. His father was the fourth son of Sir Thomas Willys, 1st Baronet and was a London merchant trading with Hamburg. Willys succeeded his brother in the baronetcy, which came to him from a cousin, on 17 July 1726.

Willys  was returned as Member of Parliament for Newport (Isle of Wight) at a by-election on  31 January 1727. At the 1727 general election he stood instead at Great Bedwyn, probably with the support of his brother-in-law Francis Stonehouse, and topped the poll.  Stonehouse was a former MP and had married Willys’ half-sister Mary Evelyn. Willys voted consistently with the Administration as long as he was in Parliament.

Willys died unmarried on 14 April 1732 and the baronetcy became extinct.

References

1680s births
1732 deaths
British MPs 1722–1727
British MPs 1727–1734
Members of Parliament for Newport (Isle of Wight)
Baronets in the Baronetage of England
Members of Parliament for Great Bedwyn